Tigrane may refer to:

Tigranes the Great (140 – 55 BC) King of Armenia

Music 
Tigrane, opera by Antonio Maria Bononcini 1710 
Tigrane (Scarlatti), 1715 opera
Tigrane (Vivaldi), 1724 opera
Tigrane (Hasse), 1729 opera